The 2022–23 FIS Alpine Ski Continental Cup (AOC) is a season of the FIS Alpine Ski Continental Cup, a series of second-level alpine skiing competitions arranged by the International Ski Federation (FIS).

Winners
The overall winners from the 2022–23 season's Continental Cups are rewarded a right to start in the first period in the following 2023–24 World Cup season.

Results

Europa Cup

Nor-Am Cup

Far East Cup

South American Cup

Australia-New Zealand Cup

References

2022 in alpine skiing
2023 in alpine skiing
Alpine ski